This was the first edition of the tournament.

Mateusz Kowalczyk and Szymon Walków won the title after defeating Ruben Gonzales and Nathaniel Lammons 7–6(8–6), 6–3 in the final.

Seeds

Draw

References

Sources
 Main Draw

Sopot Open - Doubles